KVMK (100.9 FM) is a terrestrial American radio station, licensed to Wheelock, Texas, United States, and is owned by Bryan Broadcasting Corporation.  The format is known as Maverick 100.9.

References

External links
Bryan Broadcasting Stations

VMK
Country radio stations in the United States